Ricardo Daniel Bertoni (born 14 March 1955) is an Argentine former footballer who played as a right or left winger. In Argentina, he had a successful career at Club Atlético Independiente, where he won three Copa Libertadores, one Intercontinental Cup and three Copa Interamericana trophies.

Bertoni was also capped for the Argentina national team, where he scored the 3rd goal for the team. He won the 1978 FIFA World Cup. After his retirement, he worked as manager and sports commentator.

Club career 
Bertoni started playing in Argentine's second division for Quilmes in 1972. After one year he was transferred to first division's team Independiente where he played alongside Ricardo Bochini and won one national and several international titles.

Bertoni emigrated in 1978 to Spain to play for Sevilla. He played successfully in the Italian League for many years, mainly for Fiorentina and Napoli.

International career
Bertoni played 31 times for the Argentina national football team between 1974 and 1982. in both the 1978 and the 1982 FIFA World Cups. In the 1978 World Cup on home soil, he scored Argentina's third goal in the final against Netherlands in a 3–1 extra-time win, as Argentina went on to lift the trophy.

Career statistics

Club

International
Appearances and goals by national team and year

Honours
Independiente
Argentine Primera División: Nacional 1977
Copa Libertadores: 1973, 1974, 1975
Copa Interamericana: 1973, 1974, 1976
Intercontinental Cup: 1973
Argentina
FIFA World Cup: 1978
Individual
Fiorentina Hall of Fame: 2018

References

External links

 
 
 
  
 Statistics on Bertoni's matches List of Argentine Players in Italy after 1945 at RSSSF.com

1955 births
Living people
Sportspeople from Bahía Blanca
Argentine footballers
Argentine people of Italian descent
Argentine expatriate sportspeople in Italy
Argentine expatriate sportspeople in Spain
Association football wingers
Quilmes Atlético Club footballers
Club Atlético Independiente footballers
La Liga players
Sevilla FC players
Serie A players
ACF Fiorentina players
S.S.C. Napoli players
Udinese Calcio players
Expatriate footballers in Italy
Expatriate footballers in Spain
1978 FIFA World Cup players
1982 FIFA World Cup players
Copa Libertadores-winning players
FIFA World Cup-winning players
Argentina international footballers
Argentine Primera División players
Primera Nacional players
Argentine expatriate footballers